Research Frontiers is a nanotechnology company based in Woodbury, New York that was founded by Robert Saxe in 1965 to develop light control technology from Polaroid. The company develops and licenses its patented SPD-SmartGlass technology. The company currently has six full-time employees.

Industries 

Research Frontiers' technology is applicable in transportation production, including aircraft, vehicles, boats, and yachts. It is also marketed for architectural development of residential homes and commercial offices, and for art and artifact conservation.

References

Nanotechnology companies
Technology companies of the United States
Manufacturing companies based in New York (state)
American companies established in 1965
Technology companies established in 1965